Nicholas Leventis (born 31 January 1980) is a British racing driver and founder of Strakka Racing. One of his most memorable successes was winning the 2010 24 Hours of Le Mans in the LMP2 category with Danny Watts and Jonny Kane, breaking five records in the process.

Early life
Nick Leventis was born in Kensington, London and educated at Harrow School.  Leventis initially competed in downhill alpine skiing until a serious back injury in 2003 forced him to quit the sport at a professional level.  From here, he turned his focus to motorsports.

Racing

2004 - Start of racing career, driving a BMW M3 in the BMW LMA Euro Saloon Championship, dominating Class B and finishing runner-up in the overall standings. He proved his merit in endurance racing and achieved a class win and 6th overall in the first-ever Silverstone Britcar 24 Hour.

2005 - Nick competed in the Ferrari Historic Challenge and Le Mans Classic, driving a rare Ferrari Dino 246 and scoring encouraging results.

2006 and 2007 - Victories in the Roy Salvadori Trophy at the Silverstone Classic meeting with a 1957 Aston Martin DBR1. In 2007 he reached a personal landmark with a Le Mans podium in the Legends race driving a Ferrari P3.

Nick also competed in the Belgian and Italian Touring Car Series, gaining several podiums, two class victories at Spa and consecutive wins in the prestigious Vallelunga 6 Hour Silver Cup. Other successes included podium in the Epilogue of Brno 6 Hour race and a GT1 class win and 2nd overall in the highly competitive Vallelunga Gold Cup.

2007 - Created Strakka Racing, one of Britain's leading independent racing teams.

2008 - Strakka Racing and Nick progressed to the iconic Le Mans 24 Hours with an Aston Martin DBR9 GT1.

2009 - Nick and Strakka Racing stepped up to a Ginetta-Zytek GZ09S LMP1 sports prototype in the Le Mans Series. Partnered by Danny Watts and Peter Hardman, Nick and the team claimed an impressive pole in Barcelona and finished 14th in LMP1 in the Le Mans 24 Hours.

2010 - Raced an LMP2 twin-turbo V6 engined HPD ARX-01c in the Le Mans Series, recording one of the most remarkable seasons in sportscar racing, scoring an LMP2 victory at the Le Mans 24 Hour race, breaking five records. Memorably the team also achieved the first ever LMS outright win for an LMP2 chassis, with victory at the 1,000 km race at the Hungaroring.

2012 and 2013 - Raced in the FIA World Endurance Championship with an LMP1 class HPD ARX-03a with Johnny Kane and Danny Watts. The team finished on the FIA Endurance Trophy for Private LMP1 Teams' podium in all eight races – achieving the 100% record with an outstanding final stint in Shanghai by Nick when he took the car from 4th to 3rd in the closing stages of the race. The highlight of the season was a 3rd overall finish at the 6 Hours of Bahrain.

2012 - Nick was the brainchild behind the creation of Strakka Performance in 2012, a driver development programme designed to nurture young talent to the best they can.

2015 – Leventis spearheaded the design and production of Strakka's own car, the DOME S103 at the 6 Hours of Silverstone, claiming a third place on its debut.

2016 – Nick became a member of the prestigious BRDC (British Racing Drivers’ Club), home to the most successful racing drivers from Great Britain and the Commonwealth.

With the Gibson-Nissan, Strakka's team consisting of Leventis, Jonny Kane and Danny Watts came fourth in the LMP2 class (eight overall) at the 24 Hours of Le Mans. Nick accepted the BRDC Woolf Barnato Trophy awarded to the highest placed British driver at the 24 Hours of Le Mans.

2017 – Nick and Strakka Racing started working with one of the most successful and prestigious GT3 manufacturers, McLaren. They entered the challenging Blancpain GT Series with an impressive four McLaren 650S GT3.

2018 - In 2018 Nick will expand Strakka Racing's GT activities beyond Europe, forming a new partnership with Mercedes-AMG which will see them carry Performance Team status for the German marque. The Silverstone-based team will run three new Mercedes-AMG GT3s in the Intercontinental GT Challenge alongside Blancpain GT Series Endurance Cup.

2019 - On the 24th of July, it was revealed that Leventis had tested positive to banned substances. He was thus banned for four years. Following this incident he announced his retirement.

Racing Record

Britcar 24 Hour results

24 Hours of Le Mans results

Complete FIA World Endurance Championship results

References

External links 
 
 

1980 births
Living people
People educated at Harrow School
English racing drivers
European Le Mans Series drivers
24 Hours of Le Mans drivers
FIA World Endurance Championship drivers
Britcar 24-hour drivers
Doping cases in auto racing
Sports car racing team owners
Strakka Racing drivers
Mercedes-AMG Motorsport drivers
McLaren Racing drivers